Two Rivers may refer to:

Places

North America 
 Two Rivers, Alaska, a census-designated place in Fairbanks North Star Borough
 Two Rivers, former name of Dos Rios, California
 Two River (Mississippi River tributary), a river in Minnesota
 Two Rivers (Red River of the North tributary), a river in Minnesota
 Two Rivers (town), Wisconsin
 Two Rivers, Wisconsin
 Two Rivers Township, Morrison County, Minnesota

Elsewhere 
 Two Rivers Way, footpath in Somerset, England
 Mesopotamia, the Land of the Two Rivers or The Two Rivers, referring to the Tigris and Euphrates rivers

Schools
 Two Rivers High School (disambiguation), several schools
 Two Rivers Magnet Middle School, East Hartford, Connecticut
 Two Rivers School District, Yell County, Arkansas

Entertainment
 Two Rivers (album), a 2007 album by Iraqi-American trumpeter Amir ElSaffar
 "Two Rivers" (song), a 1985 song by Northern Irish band The Adventures
 "Two Rivers", a 1989 song by Jeff Beck from the album Jeff Beck's Guitar Shop
 Two Rivers (Wheel of Time), an isolated region in Robert Jordan's novels, in which the series begins
 Billy Two Rivers (born 1935), Canadian professional wrestler and politician
 Junji Hirata (born 1956), Japanese professional wrestler a.k.a. "Sonny Two Rivers"
 E. Donald Two-Rivers (?–2008), American playwright

Other uses
 Two Rivers Correctional Institution, Umatilla, Oregon
 Two Rivers Detention Facility, Hardin, Montana
 Two Rivers Dam, dry dam in southeastern New Mexico
 Two Rivers Light, Wisconsin lighthouse
 Two Rivers Mansion (Nashville, Tennessee), historic house
 Two Rivers mine, open pit mine in South Africa
 Two Rivers Press, English company
 Two Rivers Psychiatric Hospital, Kansas City, Missouri
 Two Rivers Ranch, cattle ranch business in Florida
 Battle of Two Rivers (671) in Caledonia
 Order of the Two Rivers, award given by kings and presidents of Iraq
 "Ardulfurataini", national anthem of Iraq from 1981 to 2003

See also
 Deux Rivières (disambiguation)
 Dos Rios (disambiguation)